China North Industries Group Corporation Limited, doing business internationally as Norinco Group (North Industries Corporation), and known within China as China Ordnance Industries Group Corporation Limited, is a Chinese state-owned defense corporation that manufactures a diverse range of commercial and military products. Norinco Group is one of the world's largest defense contractors.

The company's subsidiary, China North Industries Corporation, or simply Norinco, markets Norinco Group's products internationally, and is also involved in domestic civil construction and military defense projects.

History
Established in 1980 with the approval of the State Council of China, Norinco is an enterprise group engaged in both products and capital operation, integrated with research and development, manufacturing, marketing and services. Norinco mainly deals with defense products, petroleum & mineral resources development, international engineering contracting, optronic products, civilian explosives and chemical products, sporting arms and equipment, vehicles and logistics operation, etc. Norinco has been ranked among the forefront of China's 500 largest state-owned enterprises in terms of total assets and revenue.

Russian invasion of Ukraine 

In March 2023, Politico reported that Norinco shipped assault rifles, drone parts, and body armor to Russia between June and December 2022.

U.S. sanctions 
In 1993, the import of most Norinco firearms and ammunition into the United States was blocked under new trade rules when China's permanent normal trade relations status was renewed. The prohibition did not apply to sporting shotguns or shotgun ammunition, however.  In 1994, U.S. Customs agents conducted a sting operation named Operation Dragon Fire against Atlanta-based importers of Norinco firearms as well as Poly Technologies. Seven officials were arrested after agreeing to smuggle 2,000 fully automatic Chinese-made variants of AK-47s to undercover agents the officials believed may have been connected to the mafia. At least one official, Hammond Ku, attempted to sell Chinese-produced tanks and rocket launchers to the undercover agents.

In August 2003, the Bush Administration imposed sanctions on Norinco for allegedly selling missile-related goods to Iran.  These sanctions led to a prohibition on imports into the US of the remaining types of firearms and ammunition not covered by the 1993 ban.

In November 2020, Donald Trump issued an executive order prohibiting any American company or individual from owning shares in companies that the United States Department of Defense has listed as having links to the People's Liberation Army, which included Norinco Group. In June 2021, President Joe Biden issued Executive Order 14032 expanding the scope of the national emergency declared in order 13959.

International customers
Some of Norinco's international customers include Pakistan, Zimbabwe, Canada, and the Democratic Republic of the Congo, where it negotiated arms-for-minerals deals, as well as Venezuela.

See also
 List of modern armament manufacturers

References

External links
 

 
Government-owned companies of China
Firearm manufacturers of China
Military vehicle manufacturers
Defence companies of the People's Republic of China
Chinese companies established in 1980
Chinese brands
Manufacturing companies established in 1980